A poison ring or pillbox ring is a type of ring with a container under the bezel or inside the bezel itself which could be used to hold poison or another substance; they became popular in Europe during the sixteenth century. The poison ring was used either to slip poison into an enemy's food or drink, or to facilitate the suicide of the wearer in order to preclude capture or torture. 

In Italy to this day pouring someone a drink whilst holding the bottle with the back of the hand facing downward, so as to let something drop from a ring bezel, is called versare alla traditora  (“traitor’s way pouring”) and still considered offensive.

Rings like this have been used throughout history to carry perfume, locks of hair, devotional relics, messages and other keepsakes, so they have also been known by other names. Artists would paint tiny portraits of loved ones, to be carried in what was called a “locket ring,” which was popular during the Renaissance. By the 17th century, jewelers were creating locket rings in the shape of caskets which served as mementos for mourners. These were called “funeral rings.” Rings with compartments are also called “box” rings or “socket” rings.

It is rumored that Lucrezia Borgia used a ring of this description.

The origin of poison rings

According to Marcy Waldie, who wrote about poison rings in the October 2001 article "A Ring to Die For: Poison Rings Hold Centuries of Secrets", published in Antiques & Collecting Magazine, this type of jewelry originated in ancient days of the Far East and India. It replaced the practice of wearing keepsakes and other items in pouches around the neck. The wearing of vessel rings was so practical that it spread to other parts of Asia, the Middle East and the Mediterranean before reaching Western Europe in the Middle Ages. By then the rings were part of the “holy relic trade.”

In culture

 In Asterix in Switzerland, the corrupt governor Varius Flavus uses one to poison the quaestor investigating him.
 Used by "-A" to drug Character Aria Montgomery on Freeform television series Pretty Little Liars.
 A poison ring with a hidden Cross of Lorraine appears in the film Casablanca.
 In Verdi's opera Il trovatore, Lady Leonora commits suicide by ingesting poison from her poison ring, so she can remain faithful to her lover.
 In the children's book The Haunted Spy by Barbara Ninde Byfield, the 400-year-old ghost-knight Sir Roger de Rudisell has a poison ring, which the story's narrator displays in his home as a treasured memento of the knight.
 Kenneth Parcel uses one in an episode of 30 Rock.
 Sophie Ellis-Bextor used a poison ring in the music video for her song "Murder on the Dancefloor".
 Used by Lady Gaga's character in the music video for "Paparazzi".
 Used by Jingweon Mafia members in Yakuza 2 to not reveal secrets.

References

Poisons
Rings (jewellery)